For list of newspapers in Greece and Cyprus, please see their separate articles:
List of newspapers in Greece
List of newspapers in Cyprus

The following are newspapers in the Greek language published in:

 Europe:
 Apoyevmatini (Istanbul, Turkey)
 Laiko Vima (Gjirokastër, Albania)
 North America:
 Atlantis (New York City)
 Oceania:
 Neos Kosmos (Melbourne, Australia)

See also
List of newspapers
 
Greek